Disease burden is the impact of a health problem as measured by financial cost, mortality, morbidity, or other indicators. It is often quantified in terms of quality-adjusted life years (QALYs) or disability-adjusted life years (DALYs). Both of these metrics quantify the number of years lost due to disability (YLDs), sometimes also known as years lost due to disease or years lived with disability/disease. One DALY can be thought of as one year of healthy life lost, and the overall disease burden can be thought of as a measure of the gap between current health status and the ideal health status (where the individual lives to old age without disease and disability). According to an article published in The Lancet in June 2015, low back pain and major depressive disorder were among the top ten causes of YLDs and were the cause of more health loss than diabetes, chronic obstructive pulmonary disease, and asthma combined. The study based on data from 188 countries, considered to be the largest and most detailed analysis to quantify levels, patterns, and trends in ill health and disability, concluded that "the proportion of disability-adjusted life years due to YLDs increased globally from 21.1% in 1990 to 31.2% in 2013." The environmental burden of disease is defined as the number of DALYs that can be attributed to environmental factors. Similarly, the work-related burden of disease is defined as the number of deaths and DALYs that can be attributed to occupational risk factors to human health. These measures allow for comparison of disease burdens, and have also been used to forecast the possible impacts of health interventions. By 2014 DALYs per head were "40% higher in low-income and middle-income regions."

The World Health Organization (WHO) has provided a set of detailed guidelines for measuring disease burden at the local or national level. In 2004, the health issue leading to the highest YLD for both men and women was unipolar depression; in 2010, it was lower back pain. According to an article in The Lancet published in November 2014, disorders in those aged 60 years and older represent "23% of the total global burden of disease" and leading contributors to disease burden in this group in 2014 were "cardiovascular diseases (30.3%), malignant neoplasms (15.1%), chronic respiratory diseases (9.5%), musculoskeletal diseases (7.5%), and neurological and mental disorders (6.6%)."

Statistics

In 2004, the World Health Organization calculated that 1.5 billion disability-adjusted life years were lost to disease and injury.

History

The first study on the global burden of disease, conducted in 1990, quantified the health effects of more than 100 diseases and injuries for eight regions of the world, giving estimates of morbidity and mortality by age, sex, and region. It also introduced the DALY as a new metric to quantify the burden of diseases, injuries, and risk factors. From 2000 to 2002, the 1990 study was updated to include a more extensive analysis using a framework known as comparative risk factor assessment.

Modifiable risk factors

In 2006, the WHO released a report which addressed the amount of global disease that could be prevented by reducing environmental risk factors. The report found that approximately one-fourth of the global disease burden and more than one-third of the burden among children was due to modifiable environmental factors. The "environmentally-mediated" disease burden is much higher in developing countries, with the exception of certain non-communicable diseases, such as cardiovascular diseases and cancers, where the per capita disease burden is larger in developed countries. Children have the highest death toll, with more than 4 million environmentally-caused deaths yearly, mostly in developing countries. The infant death rate attributed to environmental causes is also 12 times higher in developing countries. 85 out of the 102 major diseases and injuries classified by WHO were due to environmental factors.

To measure the environmental health impact, environment was defined as "all the physical, chemical and biological factors external to a person, and all the related behaviours". The definition of modifiable environment included:
 Air, soil, and water pollution with chemicals or biological agents
 Ultraviolet and ionizing radiation
 Noise and electromagnetic fields
 Built environment
 Agricultural methods and irrigation schemes
 Man-made climate change and ecosystem degradation
 Occupational risks, including exposure to long working hours
 Individual behaviors, such as hand-washing and food contamination due to unsafe water or dirty hands

Certain environmental factors were excluded from this definition:
 Indoor smoke from solid fuel use
 Lead
 Mercury
 Natural climate change (as opposed to human-caused climate change)
 Occupational airborne particulates or carcinogens
 Outdoor air pollution
 Sanitation and hygiene problems
 Second-hand smoke
 Solar ultraviolet radiation

Estimation

The WHO developed a methodology to quantify the health of a population using summary measures, which combine information on mortality and non-fatal health outcomes. The measures quantify either health gaps or health expectancies; the most commonly used health summary measure is the DALY.

The exposure-based approach, which measures exposure via pollutant levels, is used to calculate the environmental burden of disease. This approach requires knowledge of the outcomes associated with the relevant risk factor, exposure levels and distribution in the study population, and dose-response relationships of the pollutants.

A dose-response relationship is a function of the exposure parameter assessed for the study population. Exposure distribution and dose-response relationships are combined to yield the study population's health impact distribution, usually expressed in terms of incidence. The health impact distribution can then be converted into health summary measures, such as DALYs. Exposure-response relationships for a given risk factor are commonly obtained from epidemiological studies. For example, the disease burden of outdoor air pollution for Santiago, Chile, was calculated by measuring the concentration of atmospheric particulate matter (PM10), estimating the susceptible population, and combining these data with relevant dose-response relationships. A reduction of particulate matter levels in the air to recommended standards would cause a reduction of about 5,200 deaths, 4,700 respiratory hospital admissions, and 13,500,000 days of restricted activity per year, for a total population of 4.7 million.

In 2002, the WHO estimated the global environmental burden of disease by using risk assessment data to develop environmentally attributable fractions (EAFs) of mortality and morbidity for 85 categories of disease. In 2007, they released the first country-by-country analysis of the impact environmental factors had on health for its then 192 member states. These country estimates were the first step to assist governments in carrying out preventive action. The country estimates were divided into three parts:

Environmental burden of disease for selected risk factors
This presents the yearly burden, expressed in deaths and DALYs, attributable to: indoor air pollution from solid fuel use; outdoor air pollution; and unsafe water, sanitation, and hygiene. Results are calculated using the exposure-based approach.
Total environmental burden of disease for the relevant country
The total number of deaths, DALYs per capita, and the percentage of the national burden of disease attributable to the environment represent the disease burden that could be avoided by modifying the environment as a whole.
Environmental burden by disease category
Each country summary was broken down by the disease group, where the annual number of DALYs per capita attributable to environmental factors were calculated for each group.

Implementation and interpretation

The public health impacts of air pollution (annual means of PM10 and ozone), noise pollution, and radiation (radon and UV), can be quantified using DALYs. For each disease, a DALY is calculated as:
DALYs = number of people with the disease × duration of the disease (or loss of life expectancy in the case of mortality) × severity (varying from 0 for perfect health to 1 for death)

Necessary data include prevalence data, exposure-response relationships, and weighting factors that give an indication of the severity of a certain disorder. When information is missing or vague, experts will be consulted in order to decide which alternative data sources to use. An uncertainty analysis is carried out so as to analyze the effects of different assumptions.

Uncertainty

When estimating the environmental burden of disease, a number of potential sources of error may arise in the measure of exposure and exposure-risk relationship, assumptions made in applying the exposure or exposure-risk relationship to the relevant country, health statistics, and, if used, expert opinions.

Generally, it is not possible to estimate a formal confidence interval, but it is possible to estimate a range of possible values the environmental disease burden may take based on different input parameters and assumptions. When more than one definition has to be made about a certain element in the assessment, multiple analyses can be run, using different sets of definitions. Sensitivity and decision analyses can help determine which sources of uncertainty affect the final results the most.

Representative examples

The Netherlands

In the Netherlands, air pollution is associated with respiratory and cardiovascular diseases, and exposure to certain forms of radiation can lead to the development of cancer. Quantification of the health impact of the environment was done by calculating DALYs for air pollution, noise, radon, UV, and indoor dampness for the period 1980 to 2020. In the Netherlands, 2–5% of the total disease burden in 2000 could be attributed to the effects of (short-term) exposure to air pollution, noise, radon, natural UV radiation, and dampness in houses. The percentage can increase to up to 13% due to uncertainty, assuming no threshold.

Among the investigated factors, long-term PM10 exposure have the greatest impact on public health. As levels of PM10 decrease, related disease burden is also expected to decrease. Noise exposure and its associated disease burden is likely to increase to a level where the disease burden is similar to that of traffic accidents. The rough estimates do not provide a complete picture of the environmental health burden, because data are uncertain, not all environmental-health relationships are known, not all environmental factors have been included, and it was not possible to assess all potential health effects. The effects of a number of these assumptions were evaluated in an uncertainty analysis.

Canada

Exposure to environmental hazards may cause chronic diseases, so the magnitude of their contribution to Canada's total disease burden is not well understood. In order to give an initial estimate of the environmental burden of disease for four major categories of disease, the  developed by the WHO, EAFs developed by other researchers, and data from Canadian public health institutions were used. Results showed a total of 10,000–25,000 deaths, with 78,000–194,000 hospitalizations; 600,000–1.5 million days spent in hospital; 1.1–1.8 million restricted activity days for individuals with asthma; 8000–24,000 new cases of cancer; 500–2,500 babies with low birth weights; and C$3.6–9.1 billion in costs each year due to respiratory disease, cardiovascular illness, cancer, and congenital conditions associated with adverse environmental exposures.

Criticism

There is no consensus on the best measures of the public's health. This is not surprising because measurements are used to accomplish diverse functions (e.g., population health assessment, evaluation of the effectiveness of interventions, formulation of health policies, and projection of future resource need). The choice of measures may also depend on individual and societal values. Measures that only consider premature death will omit the burden of living with a disease or disability, and measures that combine both in a single measure (i.e. DALYs) need to make a judgment to the significance of these measures compared to each other. Other metrics such as economic costs will not capture pain and suffering or other broader aspects of burden.

DALYs are a simplification of a complex reality, and therefore only give a crude indication of environmental health impact. Relying on DALYs may make donors take a narrow approach to health care programs. Foreign aid is most often directed at diseases with the highest DALYs, ignoring the fact that other diseases, despite having lower DALYs, are still major contributors to disease burden. Less-publicized diseases thus have little or no funding for health efforts. For example, maternal death (one of the top three killers in most poor countries) and pediatric respiratory and intestinal infections maintain a high disease burden, and safe pregnancy and the prevention of coughs in infants do not receive adequate funding.

References

Citations

Sources 

 
 
 
 
 
 
 

Global health
Health informatics
Public health
Health economics